The Naval Training School is the main training institution of the Namibian Navy. It was created in 2009, and is located at the Wilbard Tashiya Nakada Military Base, Walvis Bay.

History
Recognizing the need to locally train its personnel as it was not sustainable to send sailors abroad for training for the most basic courses, the Navy set up the school was set up in 2009. The school is assisted by the resident Brazilian Military Advisory and Training Team (BRAZMATT) from the Brazilian Navy and was commissioned by President Hage Geingob inaugurated the school on 22 July 2016.

Location
The school is located at the Wilbard Tashiya Nakada Military Base, Walvis Bay.

Training

Currently the school only trains junior naval ratings, administratively its divided into two wings namely Sailors Training Wing and the Marine Training Wing.

Courses offered at the school are the:
Basic Seamanship for sailors Course
Marine Soldier Specialization
Marine Section Commander Course.
Marine Petty officers course
Sailors Petty officers Course

Leadership

References

External links 

 Talking points upon the commissioning of the Naval Training School

Military of Namibia